The Richland Trust Building is a historic bank building in downtown Mansfield, Ohio. It was built in 1929 and listed on the National Register of Historic Places in 1983. The 9-story building was designed by Althouse & Jones and was also home to business and law offices as well as a shoe store. It is adorned with angel sculptures. It was built during a building boom in Mansfield and elsewhere that preceded the stock market crash.

Althouse & Jones, a partnership between William L. Althouse and Mr. Herbert S. Jones in Mansfield, also designed the Park Avenue Baptist Church, another building on the National Register.

See also
National Register of Historic Places listings in Richland County, Ohio

References

1929 establishments in Ohio
Bank buildings on the National Register of Historic Places in Ohio
Buildings and structures in Mansfield, Ohio
Commercial buildings completed in 1929
National Register of Historic Places in Richland County, Ohio